Mark John Phythian (born 26 April 1985) is an English cricketer. Phythian is a right-handed batsman who fields as a wicket-keeper. He was born in Peterborough, Cambridgeshire and educated at Oundle School.

While studying for his degree at Durham University, Phythian made his first-class debut for Durham UCCE against Somerset in 2005. He made six further first-class appearances for the university, the last of which came against Lancashire in 2007. In his seven first-class matches, he scored 158 runs at an average of 22.57, with a high score of 62 not out. Behind the stumps he took 15 catches and made a single stumping. His highest score of 62, which was his only first-class fifty, came against Nottinghamshire in 2006.

References

External links
Mark Phythian at ESPNcricinfo
Mark Phythian at CricketArchive

1985 births
Living people
Grammy Award winners
Sportspeople from Peterborough
People educated at Oundle School
Alumni of Durham University
English cricketers
Durham MCCU cricketers
Wicket-keepers